RAPADILINO syndrome is an autosomal recessive disorder characterized by:
 RA: radial ray defect
 PA: patellar aplasia, arched or cleft palate
 DI: diarrhea, dislocated joints
 LI: little (short stature), limb malformation
 NO: slender nose, normal intelligence
It is more prevalent in Finland than elsewhere in the world. It has been associated with the gene RECQL4. This is also associated with Rothmund–Thomson syndrome and Baller–Gerold syndrome.

References

External links 

  GeneReviews/NCBI/NIH/UW entry on Baller-Gerold Syndrome

Congenital disorders of musculoskeletal system
Autosomal recessive disorders
Rare syndromes
Syndromes affecting bones
DNA replication and repair-deficiency disorders
Syndromes affecting stature